Pentanodes dietzii is a species of beetle in the family Cerambycidae. It was described by Schaeffer in 1904.

References

Tillomorphini
Beetles described in 1904